The Honda PCX is a scooter made by the Japanese manufacturer Honda, it was first introduced for sale in November 2009. Production began in September 2009 at A.P. Honda Co., Ltd. in Bangkok, Thailand.

First Generation (JF28/KF12;2010)
In early 2010, the Honda PCX 125 was launched in the UK and US, while the PCX 150 was launched in the rest of Europe and Japan.

2012 eSP Update (JF47/KF15) 

For 2012, the PCX 150 was launched in Australia. The US skipped the 2012 PCX 125 as they made a switch for the PCX 150 model which arrived in the summer of 2012, these were later sold in 2013 for both Canadian and US markets. This model became known as the PCX 125/150 eSP as the label was displayed on the airbox. 

The 2012 update featured a redesigned engine to decrease friction; increasing efficiency, and the displacement (which was increased to ). 
The new engine is based on Honda's eSP (Enhanced Smart Power) design. 
Honda continues to produce the  version (with eSP) for export to select markets, such as Europe, where local licence requirements favour this engine displacement.

2014-2018 (JF57/JF64/KF19)

Also known as PCX 125/150 LED. This generation of PCX received a major facelift in 2014. Including new LED headlights, redesigned body, and a few other tweaks.

2018-2020 (JF81/JF83)

Also known as PCX 125 Digital, Honda unveiled two new versions of the PCX at the 2017 Tokyo Motor Show, a hybrid and an electric version. The new version of Honda PCX is expected to launch to the public in 2018. This new generation PCX featured a new tubular steel frame, ABS (Anti-Locking Braking System)

Performance 

Some performance tests listed here were conducted by GridOto from Indonesia in March 2018.

2021 (JK05)

Also known as PCX 125/160 ESP+. This generation of PCX received a new facelift. This includes a redesigned duplex steel "cradle" frame, additional storage space under the seat (30.4L), traction control (Honda Selectable Torque Control), and a Smart Key (keyless) ignition system.

Technology
The global version of the Honda PCX is equipped with an idling stop system, which automatically shuts off the engine after a few seconds of idle. 
This feature is not included on the US/Canada model due to safety concerns, having a kill switch and a parking brake instead. 
To prevent excessive wear on a separate starter motor, the Honda PCX uses its alternator by supplying power to the stator (see Brushless DC electric motor). As a result, engine start is completely muted. This same technology was released in the new 2018 Honda Goldwing.

Other Honda 125/150 scooters with eSP share a common engine with the Honda PCX.

Gallery

References

External links

 Honda's News Release
 PCX at World Honda website
 PCX 2019
 Honda Worldwide: Designer's Talk PCX
 Full Specifications
 Honda Scooter Brasil - Honda PCX Clube Brasil at Honda Scooter club of Brazil (PCX Club Brazil)
 Honda PCX Tips and Tricks
 Honda PCX Reviews
 Honda PCX Customs

PCX
Motor scooters
Motorcycles introduced in 2009
Motorcycles introduced in 2017